Iuliu Bodola (26 February 1912 – 12 March 1993) was a Romanian-Hungarian footballer who played as a striker. He represented both the Romania and Hungary national team at internationally level. His nickname was Duduş/Dudus. He is Romania's third all-time top goalscorer, and he is also the all-time top goal scorer of the Balkan Cup.

Club career
Bodola started his career in 1929 (aged 17) for Clubul Atletic Oradea, before joining Venus București, with whom he was the champion of Divizia A in 1938–39 and 1939–40. When Northern Transylvania became part of the Kingdom of Hungary in August 1940, he preferred to play for Nagyváradi AC, and with them he won the Nemzeti Bajnokság I in 1943–44. After the end of the war, he returned to Romania with Ferar Cluj-Napoca, but in 1946 he left again for Hungary joining MTK, where he lived in Budapest until the end of his life. In November 2008, the name of the Municipal Stadium in Oradea was named after him, becoming the Stadionul Iuliu Bodola.

International career
Bodola was a very prolific scorer for the Romania national team, scoring a then-national record of 31 goals in 48 caps. He and Wetzer were the top two goalscorers of the 1929–1931 (first) edition of the Balkan Cup (which Romania won). They scored seven goals each for their country in that tournament alone. He was also part of the Romania team that won the 1933 Balkan Cup and 1936 Balkan Cup, contributing with two goals in each tournament. With 15 goals in the Balkan Cup, he is the all-time top goal scorer in the competition's history. Bodola was the hero of the 1936 Friendship Cup, scoring a hat-trick in a 3–2 win over Yugoslavia, and with these three goals, he is also the all-time top goal scorer of the Friendship Cup. This was Bodola's third international hat-trick (the first two having come in 1931, in a friendly against Lithuania and in the 1929-31 Balkan Cup against Greece), which still remains a national record. He played at both the 1934 FIFA World Cup and 1938 FIFA World Cup for Romania, failing to score a single goal at both tournaments.

When Northern Transylvania became part of the Kingdom of Hungary in August 1940, he decided to play for the Hungary national team, scoring on his debut on 1 December 1940 against Italy in a 1–1 draw.

For a long time (50 years) he was the absolute top scorer of the Romania national football team - with 31 goals. Subsequently, he was overtaken by Gheorghe Hagi, and then by Adrian Mutu, both with 35 goals scored. Seven decades after retiring, Bodola still occupies the third place in the all-time top scorers list of the Romania national football team, with 31 goals, the first place being shared by Hagi and Mutu, both having 35 goals in Romania's shirt.

Personal life
He died in Budapest in 1993 (aged 80).

His son György Bodola was a Hungarian illustrator.

Career statistics

Scores and results list Romania's and Hungary's goal tally first, score column indicates score after each Bodola goal.

Honours
Venus București
Romanian Championship League: 1938–39, 1939–40

Nagyváradi AC
Hungarian Championship League: 1943–44

Romania
 Balkan Cup: 1929–31, 1933, 1936

Individual
 Balkan Cup top scorer: 1929–31 with 7 goals.

References

External links
 
 
 
 
Iuliu Bodola player profile at Labtof.ro
Iuliu Bodola manager profile at Labtof.ro

1912 births
1993 deaths
Romanian sportspeople of Hungarian descent
Sportspeople from Brașov
People from the Kingdom of Hungary
Romanian footballers
Hungarian footballers
Association football forwards
CA Oradea players
Venus București players
MTK Budapest FC players
Liga I players
Nemzeti Bajnokság I players
Romania international footballers
Hungary international footballers
1934 FIFA World Cup players
1938 FIFA World Cup players
Dual internationalists (football)
Romanian football managers
Hungarian football managers
Diósgyőri VTK managers
Szombathelyi Haladás football managers
Nemzeti Bajnokság I managers
Pécsi MFC managers